The Castellammarese War was a bloody power struggle for control of the Italian-American Mafia that took place in New York City, New York, from February 1930 until April 15, 1931, between partisans of Joe "The Boss" Masseria and those of Salvatore Maranzano. The war was named after the Sicilian town of Castellammare del Golfo, the birthplace of Maranzano. Maranzano's faction won and divided New York's crime families into the Five Families; Maranzano declared himself capo di tutti i capi ("boss of all bosses"). However, Maranzano was murdered in September 1931 on orders of Lucky Luciano, who established a power-sharing arrangement called the Commission, a group of Mafia families of equal stature, to avoid such wars in the future.

Background
In the 1920s, Mafia operations in the United States were controlled by Giuseppe "Joe The Boss" Masseria, whose faction consisted mainly of gangsters from Sicily, along with Calabria (the 'Ndrangheta) and Campania (the Camorra) regions of southern Italy. Masseria's faction included Charles "Lucky" Luciano, Albert "Mad Hatter" Anastasia, Vito Genovese, Alfred Mineo, Willie Moretti, Joe Adonis, and Frank Costello. However, powerful Sicilian Don Vito Ferro decided to make a bid for control of Mafia operations. He sent Salvatore Maranzano from his base in Castellammare del Golfo to seize control. The Castellammarese faction in the U.S. included Joseph "Joe Bananas" Bonanno, Stefano "The Undertaker" Magaddino, Joseph Profaci, and Joe Aiello. As it became more and more evident that the two factions would clash for leadership of the Mafia, they each sought to recruit more followers to support them.

Outwardly, the Castellammarese War was between the forces of Masseria and Maranzano. Underneath, however, there was also a generational conflict between the old guard Sicilian leadership  known as the "Mustache Petes" for their long mustaches and old-world ways, such as refusing to do business with non-Italians  and the "Young Turks", a younger and more diverse Italian-American group who, unlike the "Mustache Petes", had grown up in the U.S., were more forward-thinking, and were willing to work with non-Italians. This approach led Masseria's followers to question whether he was even capable of making the Mafia prosper in the world of the 1930s. Led by Luciano, the aim of this group was to end the war as soon as possible in order to resume their businesses, viewing the conflict as unnecessary. Luciano's objective was to modernize the mob and do away with unnecessary orthodox norms. This was a vision that enabled Luciano to attract followers, who had seen the inadequacies of Masseria's traditionalist leadership. Therefore, both factions were fluid, with many mobsters switching sides or killing their own allies during the war. Tensions between the Maranzano and Masseria factions were evident as far back as 1928, with one side frequently hijacking the other's alcohol trucks (alcohol production being illegal in the U.S. at that time due to Prohibition).

Hostilities begin
As the war became more violent, gunmen clashed on the streets of New York City. Masseria had reportedly been humiliated by Milazzo's refusal to support him in a  dispute involving the Chicago Outfit and Al Capone.

The opening salvo in the war was fired within the Masseria faction when, on February 26, 1930, Masseria ordered the murder of an ally, Gaetano Reina. Masseria gave the job to a young Genovese, who killed Reina with a shotgun. Masseria's intent was to protect his secret allies Tommy Gagliano, Tommy Lucchese, and Dominick "The Gap" Petrilli. Later his treachery would come back to haunt him, as the Reina family then threw its support behind Maranzano. Vito Bonventre also became a target, as Castellammarese-born members of Nicolo Schiro's gang began to threaten Masseria's domination over Mafia gangs. Masseria forced Schiro to pay him US$10,000 (approximately US$170,000 in 2022) and step down as boss of the gang. On July 15, 1930, Bonventre was gunned down outside his garage.

Trading blows
On August 15, 1930, Castellammerese loyalists executed a key Masseria enforcer, Giuseppe Morello, at Morello's East Harlem office (a visitor, Giuseppe Peraino, was also killed). Two weeks later, Masseria suffered another blow. After Reina's murder, Masseria had appointed Joseph Pinzolo to take over the ice-distribution racket. However, on September 9, the Reina family shot and killed Pinzolo at a Times Square office rented by Lucchese. After these two murders, the Reina crew formally joined forces with the Castellammarese.

Masseria soon struck back. On October 23, 1930, Castellammarese ally Joe Aiello, president of the Chicago Unione Siciliane, was murdered in Chicago.

The tide turns
Following the murder of Aiello, the tide of war rapidly turned in favor of the Castellammarese. On November 5, 1930, Mineo and a key member of Masseria's gang, Steve Ferrigno, were murdered. Francesco Scalice inherited control of Mineo's gang and subsequently defected to the Maranzano faction. At this point, many other members of Masseria's gang also began defecting to Maranzano, rendering the original battle lines of the conflict (Castellammarese versus non-Castellammarese) meaningless. On February 3, 1931, another important Masseria lieutenant, Joseph Catania, was gunned down, dying two days later.

Given the worsened situation, Masseria allies Luciano and Genovese started communicating with Castellammarese leader Maranzano. The two men agreed to betray Masseria if Maranzano would end the war. A deal was struck, based on which Luciano would arrange for Masseria to be murdered and Maranzano would bring the Castellammarese War to an end. On April 15, 1931, Masseria was killed at Nuova Villa Tammaro, a restaurant in Coney Island, Brooklyn. While they played cards, Luciano allegedly excused himself to the bathroom, with the gunmen reportedly being Anastasia, Genovese, Joe Adonis, and Benjamin "Bugsy" Siegel; Ciro "The Artichoke King" Terranova drove the getaway car, but legend has it that he was too shaken up to drive away and had to be shoved out of the driver's seat by Siegel.

However, according to The New York Times, "[A]fter that, the police have been unable to learn definitely [what happened]". Reputedly Masseria was "seated at a table playing cards with two or three unknown men" when he was fired upon from behind. He died from gunshot wounds to his head, back, and chest. Masseria's autopsy report shows that he died on an empty stomach. No witnesses came forward, though "two or three" men were observed leaving the restaurant and getting into a stolen car. No one was convicted in Masseria's murder as there were no witnesses and Luciano had an alibi.

The new Mafia structure
With the death of Masseria, the war ended. Maranzano organized the Mafia in New York City using a clear structure and hierarchy by dividing the main Italian gangs in New York into Five Families. Each family had a boss, underboss, consigliere, capos, soldiers, and associates. While associates could come from any background, the higher ranks had to be "made men", required in most eras to be full-blooded Italian Americans. Shortly after Masseria's death, Maranzano announced that the Five Families would be led by Luciano, Joe Bonanno, Joseph Profaci, Vincent Mangano and Thomas Gagliano.

Except for New York City, the major urban areas in the Northeast and Midwest were organized into one family per city by Maranzano; due to the size of organized crime in New York, it was organized into five separate families. The bosses of the Five Families of New York were to be Luciano (now the Genovese crime family), Profaci (now the Colombo crime family), Gagliano (now the Lucchese crime family), Maranzano (now the Bonanno crime family), and Frank Scalice (now the Gambino crime family). Maranzano called a meeting of crime bosses in Wappingers Falls, New York, where he declared himself capo di tutti capi ("boss of all bosses").

Each crime family was to be headed by a boss, who was assisted by an underboss (the third-ranking position of consigliere was added somewhat later). Below the underboss, the family was divided into crews, each headed by a caporegime, or capo, and staffed by soldiers. The soldiers would often be assisted by associates, who were not yet members. Associates could also include non-Italians who worked with the family, and would include Meyer Lansky and Benjamin "Bugsy" Siegel.

Death of Maranzano
Maranzano's reign as capo di tutti capi was short-lived. Although Maranzano was slightly more forward-thinking than Masseria, Luciano had come to believe that Maranzano was even more greedy and hidebound than Masseria had been. On September 10, 1931, he was shot and stabbed to death in his Manhattan office by a team of Jewish triggermen (recruited by Lansky), which included Samuel "Red" Levine, Bo Weinberg, and Bugsy Siegel.

With both Maranzano and Masseria out of the way, it was easier for the Young Turks, led by Luciano, to assume control of the way things functioned in New York City. The first agenda on the table was the reformation and restructuring of the American Mafia. Luciano envisioned the future of the American Mafia in the form of a major corporation. He believed that this would increase cooperation, reduce conflict and ensure plain sailing governance by the Mafia as a whole. Since Maranzano had formed a basic structure that was in the process of being put into effect, Luciano decided to retain the concept to a large extent. Owing to his clear disregard for orthodox ideologies that did not have any profitable consequences, Luciano allowed for more flexibility in the structure, allowing for the inclusion of other societal groups like the Jews to involve themselves with the families. In Joe Bonanno's autobiography A Man of Honor, he states: "We revised the old custom of looking toward one man, one supreme leader for advice and the settling of disputes. We replaced leadership by one man with leadership by committee. We opted for a parliamentary arrangement whereby a group of the most important men in our world would assume the function formerly performed by one man."

In the aftermath of the Maranzano hit, there was believed to have been a massive purge of "old-timer" mafiosi, the so-called "Night of the Sicilian Vespers". These rumors were seemingly confirmed by the testimony of Joseph Valachi, but a later study found no signs of such massive violence occurring. Luciano formed "The Commission" to oversee all Mafia activities in the United States and serve to mediate conflicts between families, eliminating the capo di tutti capi position.

In the end, both of the traditional factions in the New York Mafia lost the war. The real winners were the younger and more ruthless generation of mobsters, headed by Luciano. With their ascension to power, organized crime was poised to expand into a truly national and multi-ethnic combination.

Popular culture
 The 1981 movie Gangster Wars and the 1991 Mobsters are partly fictionalized accounts of the Castellammarese War, while 1981's The Gangster Chronicles TV miniseries covers the war over a few of its thirteen episodes. All of these cover events from the point of view of Luciano. 
 Events from the war (most notably the assassination of Maranzano) are fictionalized in Mario Puzo's novel The Godfather.
 The 1973 Charles Bronson movie The Stone Killer is a fictionalized story of a complicated plot to assassinate the heads of organized crime families using Vietnam veterans. The plot is the brainchild of an elderly mafioso who has been obsessed since 1931 with avenging the "Night of the Sicilian Vespers" murders, supposedly orchestrated by Lucky Luciano.
 The war is one of the main plot elements of the final season of Boardwalk Empire.
 AMC's The Making of the Mob: New York also covers the war.

See also
Sicilian Mafia

References
Notes

Sources

American Mafia wars
Organized crime in New York City
Organized crime conflicts in the United States
Conflicts in 1930
Conflicts in 1931